Ejdus is a Serbian surname. Notable people with the surname include:

Predrag Ejdus (1947–2018), Serbian actor
Vanja Ejdus (born 1976), Serbian actress, daughter of Predrag

Serbian surnames